Mary Elizabeth McCracken (February 2, 1911 – October 19, 1945) was the first woman to overcome infantile paralysis to become a medical missionary. She was the third of eight children and the daughter of the medical missionaries Josiah Calvin McCracken and Helen Newpher McCracken, also known as the "McCrackens of Shanghai". Mary Elizabeth followed her father's footsteps and worked alongside him to perform surgery on citizens affected by the Sino-Japanese conflict in Shanghai. She also headed the pediatrics department of her father's Refugee Hospital for many years.

Mary Elizabeth was often referred to as the "indomitable Mary" as she persevered until the end and did not let her disabilities hinder her service. Despite her physical handicap, she finished at the top of her class at St. John's University in Shanghai.

Background

Childhood: A Foundation in Missions 
Mary Elizabeth McCracken was born on February 2, 1911, in Canton, China where her parents were stationed as medical missionaries. Mary Elizabeth was the third of eight children. She had five sisters (Helen McCracken Fulcher, Margaret McCracken, Martha Constance McCracken Howard, Elsie McCracken, and Ruth McCracken) and two brothers (Josiah C. McCracken and Stewart McCracken). At the young age of thirteen months, Mary Elizabeth was afflicted with infantile paralysis. She could not walk and constantly needed to be carried everywhere. Since Mary Elizabeth's mother graduated with a degree in physical education from Columbia University, Mary Elizabeth's mother persistently cared for her and sought to make her life as normal as possible.

As a child, Mary Elizabeth enjoyed music and sang with her family. She knew how to play piano, as all the children in her family were taught by their mother. As a child, she enjoyed playing with Kewpie dolls and creating paper doll families with her older sisters. Though she faced many challenges due to her condition, Mary Elizabeth was always a good sport. In sports events requiring physical movement, she could not play with her siblings but instead took on the role of the timekeeper.

Education: A Cosmopolitan Journey in Schooling 
In the Fall of 1916, Mary Elizabeth began school at the Shanghai American School, a private school that was two to three blocks away from the family's residence at 8 Darroch Road in Shanghai. She was pulled everyday to school in a long wagon by her mother. As Mary Elizabeth had to be carried to class and recess, her mother often had to be present to perform such a duty.

After the family moved to the United States in 1920, it was a challenge to find a school for Mary Elizabeth to attend. Only when a druggist from the neighborhood allowed an employee to carry Mary Elizabeth was she able to finally attend a school. Eventually, in 1924, she went to the Watson Home in Pittsburgh, Pennsylvania for both treatment and schooling. She stayed there until she completed high school.

In the Fall of 1927, Mary Elizabeth followed in her older sister Helen McCracken Fulcher's footsteps and attended Lake Erie College. She roomed with Helen the first year and her other sister Margaret for the following two years. Her sisters helped wheelchair and carry her during these times. The college faculty was very interested in Mary Elizabeth and her attitude towards learning. Mary Elizabeth developed a liking for history, learned how to swim, and joined archery during college.

After graduating from Lake Erie College, Mary Elizabeth went on to study at the University of Pennsylvania. She studied biology and received her Master of Arts in Anatomy.

As she told her father Josiah Calvin McCracken she was interested in attending medical school, her father invited her to study under him in China. She ended up attending Women's Christian Medical College in Shanghai. She did so well in anatomy that the second year she was at the school she taught the subject herself. She later transferred to St. John's University, continuing to teach anatomy. She completed a year of internship at the Refugee Hospital and then received her graduation diploma at the head of her class in 1939.

Treatments: A Lifetime Battle 
Mary Elizabeth struggled against infantile paralysis all of her life. With a physician as a father and physical therapist as a mother, Mary Elizabeth was not left alone to tackle this disease. Her entire family including her brothers and sisters took part in helping Mary Elizabeth move from place to place. During college at Lake Erie College, her older sisters Helen and Margaret carried her throughout the day across campus to her classes.

Initially after Mary Elizabeth was struck with this disease, her mother did her best to treat her but this was not enough. Reaching out to his friend, Mary Elizabeth's father sought out consultation from Dr. Abraham Flexner in 1915. In 1916, Mary Elizabeth and her father traveled to Boston so she could receive care to straighten her back.

In February 1919, Mary Elizabeth began to go to the Red Cross Hospital in Shanghai to receive electrical treatments three times per week. She had to be brought home early to rest before every treatment, thus, she had to leave school early for each treatment. Though Mary Elizabeth broke her leg in December 1919, she still persisted in attending school in her cast. In February 1921, the family made the hard decision to send Mary Elizabeth to the Watson Home for crippled children in Pittsburgh, Pennsylvania to receive care under Dr. David Silvers. This is where she ended up for her entire high school career. Though the family returned to Shanghai on June 23, 1921, Mary wasn't able to improve in Shanghai and made the decision to return in the Summer of 1923 to the Watson Home.

In 1934, Mary Elizabeth attended medical school and was able to use her own rickshaw and coolie. This allowed for greater independence for her as she went to school and made new friends. Being the “indomitable Mary,” she was an independent person, never letting others perform any task for her if she could do it herself. Her entire family treated her like a normal child and despite her handicap, she was always welcomed in different settings due to her warm and friendly personality. Such traits were key to her success, allowing the title of the first female to overcome infantile paralysis to become a medical missionary.

Mission Work

Motivation for Medical Missions 
Mary Elizabeth was born into the medical missionary setting in Shanghai as her parents were medical missionaries themselves. With such an upbringing, Mary Elizabeth was able to see all the facets of the missionary life. She didn't just view the missionary life from a distance but she herself was actually impacted in many ways by this lifestyle. Her life was split between time in Shanghai and the United States. She became used to being apart from her parents when she was seeking education in the United States while her parents stayed in Shanghai to serve. She knew that her parents wouldn't be able to make it to many important life events including her graduation or the weddings of her siblings.

Despite all this, she understood the importance of her parents' roles and the impact that the "McCrackens of Shanghai" had. This motivated Mary Elizabeth to follow in her father's footsteps to pursue a medical degree and become a medical missionary in China. Though this was a lofty goal, she did not let her paralysis hinder her. She took up challenges and obstacles with one goal in mind: to serve the children in Shanghai. To Mary Elizabeth, her fight against infantile paralysis transformed from a part of her that she had to deal with into a trait she could overcome or even leverage to become the medical missionary she hoped to be for the Chinese children.

Service in Shanghai 
After Mary Elizabeth's internship at the Refugee Hospital, she stayed one more year to work in the pediatrics department. By this time, she practically ran the entire pediatrics department at the hospital. During the Sino-Japanese War, she worked with the Red Cross to gain access to powdered milk for the refugee babies she took care of. Wanting the best for her patients, she went beyond what the Red Cross gave her, using most of her own money to buy medicines and supplies, like soybean powdered milk—a more superior supplement than just powdered milk, for "her children".

Specializing in pediatrics, she returned to the United States to work in the Children's Hospital of Philadelphia to gain more experience. She finished her work at the Children's Hospital on July 1, 1941. After her time at the Children's Hospital, she hoped to return to China to serve the children in Shanghai. Returning to China was harder now because the Chinese had just banned “all women and useless men.” Despite this, Mary Elizabeth was determined to return.

By seeking out her father's second cousin, Dr. Henry Noble McCracken, president of Vassar College whom had relations with President Franklin Roosevelt, she was able to get her passport approved. One reason she was able to receive her visa was because President Roosevelt himself was diagnosed with infantile paralysis too. After receiving approval, she headed back to the Refugee Hospital, where her father was in charge, to take the lead of pediatrics department again.

When she returned her father noted a few differences about the way she worked. She didn't seek to abide by her father's hospital rules anymore, though she previously was most obedient. She was also overly cautious about not wasting anything—drinking even the residual milk in a cup after rinsing it with water. She wanted to use all of her resources most effectively to be able to serve the children the best that she could—never thinking of herself even though she constantly struggled with her disability.

Homecoming of the McCrackens 
Though Mary Elizabeth was born in Shanghai and served for the most part in China, she also spent a large amount of time in the US for schooling or treatment. Where home was for the McCrackens gradually became more and more unclear, especially since the siblings were constantly scattered and split between the two countries.

On December 8, 1941, the Chinese Nationalist Government overtook the hospital and told the McCrackens to leave, in addition to this, Mary Elizabeth's condition and her father's health were slowly worsening. As a result, in 1942, Mary Elizabeth left China with her parents on the Italian ship Contri Verde. On the ship, she became bedridden with meningitis and was checked into a hospital when she arrived in the United States. Mary Elizabeth McCracken died on October 18, 1945.

Legacy: The McCracken Signature 
Mary Elizabeth followed in her father's footsteps to become a medical missionary despite her battle with infantile paralysis all her life. She graduated medical school at the top of her class and became a pediatrician who served the Chinese people in Shanghai. Mary Elizabeth was the only woman who earned a medical degree from St. John's University. She was often referred to as the "indomitable Mary" as she persevered until the end and did not let her disabilities hinder her service.

In honor of Mary Elizabeth and as a memorial to his daughter, Josiah Calvin McCracken created the Mary E. McCracken Fund to further Mary Elizabeth's service to the Chinese. The fund named specifically after her was used to benefit the children in China whom Mary cared dearly for. As a result of her family's service in Shanghai, the McCrackens will always be known as the "McCrackens of Shanghai" for their service during such challenging times in China.

In 1942, Mary Elizabeth left China with her parents on the Italian ship Contri Verde. On the ship, she became bedridden with meningitis and was checked in to a hospital when she arrived in the United States. Mary Elizabeth McCracken died on October 18, 1945. On her gravestone in the Woodlawn Cemetery in Bronx, New York, the phrase "Beloved Physician" is engraved. Mary Elizabeth was indeed a “Beloved Physician,” endeared by all she spoke to, even those she met on her voyages, and especially loved by the children she served in Shanghai.

Notes

References 
 McCracken, Dr. Josiah Calvin. Mary Elizabeth McCracken. Comp. Katherine R. Wilson. Mar. 1951. Dictated by her father to Katherine R. Wilson at Atlantic City, N.J., March 1951. Atlantic City, N.J.
 Fulcher, Helen McCracken. Mission to Shanghai: The Life of Medical Service of Dr. Josiah C. McCracken. New London, NH: Tiffin, 1995. Print.
 "Paralyzed Daughter of Penn Star in War: Mary McCracken Assists Father in Surgery at Shanghai." n.d.: n. pag. Print.
 McCracken, Dr. Josiah Calvin. "Merry Christmas." Letter to McCracken Supporters. 26 Nov. 1936. MS. Shanghai, China.
 McCracken, Dr. Josiah Calvin. China Medical Committee Meeting Notes. 10 Nov. 1958.
 NWpioneer. "Dr Mary Elizabeth McCracken (1911 - 1945) - Find A Grave Memorial." Dr Mary Elizabeth McCracken (1911 - 1945) - Find A Grave Memorial. Find a Grave, 04 Apr. 2016. Web. 29 Oct. 2016.
 Chen, Kaiyi. "ARCHIVAL COLLECTIONS." Guide, Josiah C. McCracken Papers (UPT 50 MCC883), University Archives, University of Pennsylvania. University of Pennsylvania University Archives and Records Center, n.d. Web. 29 Oct. 2016.

1911 births
1945 deaths
Medical missionaries